Christopher Lee Stratton (born August 22, 1990) is an American professional baseball pitcher for the St. Louis Cardinals of Major League Baseball (MLB). He has previously played in MLB for the San Francisco Giants, Los Angeles Angels, and Pittsburgh Pirates.

College career
Stratton graduated from Tupelo High School, in Tupelo, Mississippi. He then attended Mississippi State University from 2010 to 2012. In 2011, he played collegiate summer baseball with the Harwich Mariners of the Cape Cod Baseball League. As a senior, he was a consensus All-American after going 11–2 with a 2.38 earned run average and 127 strikeouts. He was also the Southeastern Conference Pitcher of the Year. He also won the C Spire Ferriss Trophy as Mississippi's top collegiate baseball player.

Professional career

San Francisco Giants
Stratton was drafted by the San Francisco Giants in the first round of the 2012 Major League Baseball draft. In August, he was hospitalized after a line drive struck him in the head.

Before the 2013 season, Baseball America ranked Stratton as the Giants' third best prospect. The Giants added him to their 40-man roster after the 2015 season.

Stratton was called up from the Sacramento River Cats (AAA-Pacific Coast League) to the majors on May 28, 2016, to replace the injured Matt Cain. Despite being primarily a starter in the minors, the Giants added Stratton to their bullpen and he made his major league debut against the Atlanta Braves on May 30, pitching a scoreless bottom of the eighth inning and recording two strikeouts while retiring all three batters he faced. On June 11, he was credited with his first major league win as he pitched the top of the 10th inning in the Giants victory  against the Los Angeles Dodgers. On June 13 he was sent down again when Cain returned from the DL, but was recalled from the minors the following day when Cain was put back on the DL with a reinjured hamstring. Stratton pitched in seven games for the Giants with a 1–0 record and a 3.60 ERA. He compiled a 12–6 record and a 3.87 ERA during the year for the Sacramento River Cats.

In 2018, Stratton was 'up-&-down' twice with Giants and the River Cats. On September 14, 2018, Stratton threw his first MLB complete game against the Colorado Rockies, winning by a score of 2–0. It was his 10th win of the season, making him the Giants’ first pitcher to reach double-digit victories since 2016.
It was also the first complete game of the season for the Giants, and the first shutout for the team in over a year. Stratton finished the 2018 season with 10 wins, leading the Giants in wins.

Los Angeles Angels
On March 26, 2019, Stratton was traded to the Los Angeles Angels in exchange for Williams Jerez. He was designated for assignment on May 7, 2019.

Pittsburgh Pirates
On May 11, 2019, Stratton was traded to the Pittsburgh Pirates in exchange for cash considerations. In  innings with the Pirates, Stratton pitched to a 3.66 ERA with a 9.1 K/9 rate and 1.39 WHIP. In 2020, Stratton recorded a 3.90 ERA with 39 strikeouts and a career-high 11.9 K/9 rate in 30.0 innings of work. In 2021, Stratton led the Pirates with seven wins and recorded a 3.63 ERA with 86 strikeouts over  innings.

St. Louis Cardinals

On August 1, 2022, Stratton and José Quintana were traded to the St. Louis Cardinals for Malcom Núñez and Johan Oviedo.

References

External links

Mississippi State Bulldogs bio

1990 births
Living people
Sportspeople from Tupelo, Mississippi
Baseball players from Mississippi
Major League Baseball pitchers
San Francisco Giants players
Los Angeles Angels players
Pittsburgh Pirates players
St. Louis Cardinals players
Mississippi State Bulldogs baseball players
Harwich Mariners players
Salem-Keizer Volcanoes players
Augusta GreenJackets players
San Jose Giants players
Richmond Flying Squirrels players
Sacramento River Cats players
All-American college baseball players
Tupelo High School alumni